Benedikt Lampert (born 21 February 1985) is a Liechtensteiner bobsledder. He was the bobsled alternate for Liechtenstein at the 2010 Winter Olympics.

See also 
Sports of Liechtenstein

References 

Liechtenstein male bobsledders
Olympic bobsledders of Liechtenstein
Bobsledders at the 2010 Winter Olympics
1985 births
Living people
21st-century Liechtenstein people